Andrey Josué Soto Ruiz (born 8 April 2003) is a Costa Rican footballer who currently plays as a midfielder for San Carlos.

Career statistics

Club

Notes

References

2003 births
Living people
Costa Rican footballers
Costa Rica youth international footballers
Association football forwards
A.D. San Carlos footballers
Liga FPD players
People from San Carlos (canton)
21st-century Costa Rican people